These are the results of the Men's Pole Vault event at the 2003 World Championships in Athletics in Paris, France.

Medalists

Schedule
All times are Central European Time (UTC+1)

Abbreviations
All results shown are in metres

Records

Results

Qualification
Qualification: Qualifying Performance 5.75 (Q) or at least 12 best performers (q) advance to the final.

Final
28 August

See also
Athletics at the 2003 Pan American Games - Men's pole vault

References
Qualification results (archived)
Final results (archived)
Results

- Mens Pole Vault, 2003 World Championships In Athletics
Pole vault at the World Athletics Championships